Luisa Silei (February 17, 1825 – February 5, 1898) was an Italian painter who mainly painted landscapes.

Life 
Luisa was born and resided in Florence. She studied with Carlo Marko. She exhibited in 1883, in Roma: Dawn is Near and A trip in Autumn. At the 1884 Turin Exhibition of Fine Arts, she exhibits: Il sorger della Luna. In this same time, at the Exposition of the Society of the Encouragement of Fine Arts of Florence: Flowers which in 1885, was re-exhibited at the same Exposition. She also participated in the 1882 Florentine Exhibition of Fine Arts. One of her master works is Reminiscenze del Lago d' Orbetello.

References

1825 births
1898 deaths
Painters from Florence
Italian women painters
19th-century Italian painters
19th-century Italian women artists